Graham Johnson (born 20 November 1943) is an Australian sprint canoeist who competed in the early 1970s. He was eliminated in the semifinals of the K-2 1000 m event at the 1972 Summer Olympics in Munich.

References

1943 births
Australian male canoeists
Canoeists at the 1972 Summer Olympics
Living people
Olympic canoeists of Australia
20th-century Australian people